Vedivazhipadu is a 2013 Malayalam sex comedy film scripted and directed by newcomer Shambu Purushothaman, a graduate of Satyajit Ray Film and Television Institute. The cast includes Indrajith Sukumaran, Murali Gopy, Saiju Kurup, Anumol, Sreejith Ravi, Anusree and Mythili. The film was produced by director Arun Kumar Aravind under the banner of Karmayug Movies. Award-winning cinematographer Shehnad Jalal, Shambu's classmate from SRFTII, cranked the camera, while Bijibal scored the background music.

Vedivazhipadu depicts the events in a time frame of 24 hours on the Pongala festival day at the Attukal Temple. The film mired in controversy as the Censor Board had issues with the content  and denied a censor certificate. It was later given an Adults Only Certificate by the Censor Board  and released on 12 December 2013.

Plot
Vedivazhipadu describe the events in a time frame of 24 hours on the Pongala festival day at the Attukal Temple. Three friends, Sanjay, Pradeep and Rahul, have made secret plans for the day when their wives will be away attending the festival. Sanjay, who is a cashier in a bank, is married to Rashmi, a bold and outgoing TV journalist who is a star in her own right. She has been covering the Pongala live for her channel. It does not take us long to guess who is the boss here. Pradeep is an investor in stocks and does his business with the help of stockbroker Joseph. Pradeep is married to Vidya, a French teacher. They are mismatched, as he looks rustic and she is sophisticated. Rahul is a geeky video games tester working from home. He is married to Radhika, a docile housewife. On the said day, the friends gather in Rahul's apartment. They have booze and a woman and plans to enjoy themselves.

Cast
 Indrajith Sukumaran as Joseph 
 Mythili as Vidya
 Murali Gopy as Rahul
 Sreejith Ravi as Pradeep
 Saiju Kurup as Sanjay
 Anumol as Sumitra
 Anusree as Reshmi
 Anjana Haridas as Radhika
 Sunil Sukhada as Mathaikunju
 Ashvin Mathew as PP
 Indrans as Rajappan
  Parvathy as Padma
 Alencier as Swami
 Praveena (Guest Appearance)
 Manka Mahesh  (Guest Appearance)
 Lakshmi  (Guest Appearance)

References

2013 films
2010s Malayalam-language films
2010s sex comedy films
Indian sex comedy films
2013 directorial debut films
2013 comedy films